The Mandurah line is a commuter railway and service on the Transperth network in Western Australia that runs from Perth south to the state's second largest city Mandurah. The service is operated by Transperth Train Operations, a division of the Public Transport Authority. At its northern end, the line (travelling south) begins as a continuation of the Joondalup line at Perth Underground, and (travelling north) ends as a continuation of the Joondalup line at Elizabeth Quay. The first  of the line is underground, passing under the Perth central business district. The line surfaces and enters the median of the Kwinana Freeway just north of the Swan River. The final stretch of the line goes south from Rockingham to Mandurah.

Planning for a railway line to Mandurah began in the early 1990s, during the construction of the Joondalup line. The first route proposed was an extension of the Fremantle line to Mandurah passing directly through the Rockingham town centre. The preferred route was later changed to a spur off the Armadale line at Kenwick via Thornlie for reasons of cost. Following a change in state government in 2001, the route was changed again, this time to a direct route along the Kwinana Freeway south of Perth with Rockingham station relocated to align with the more direct route. Construction began in March 2004. The underground portion of the line, between Perth and Esplanade station, was the first section to open. It began operating on 15 October 2007. The rest of the line opened on 23 December 2007. Since opening, one new station along the line has opened, and another new station has begun construction. The line will be connected to the Armadale line via Cockburn Central and the Thornlie spur line.

Trains take 51 minutes to get from Perth Underground to Mandurah station. The line is the busiest on the Transperth network, with 14.4 million boardings in the 2021–22 financial year. Headways are at least every 15 minutes during the day, rising to every 5 minutes on parts during peak time.

History

Proposals and early planning
Just as detailed planning for the Northern Suburbs Transit System was underway, the South West Area Transit (SWAT) Study was formed in February 1989 to examine the possibilities for extending Perth's rail services to the city's south west. A SWAT report was released in 1990 recommending a rapid transit system to Rockingham and Mandurah. The two options the report considered were an extension of the Fremantle line or a spur off the Armadale line at Kenwick. Both of these options would utilise pre-existing freight railways, although sections of the Fremantle freight railway had the problem of being only single track. With the Armadale, Fremantle and Midland lines about to be electrified in the early 1990s, the report suggested using the leftover diesel railcars to minimise initial costs.

Planning for the line was transferred to the Department of Transport in 1991. The Department then released a report in 1992 for recommending a light rail line from Fremantle to the south west metropolitan area. Later that year, the Lawrence government made an in-principle commitment to building a rail line from Fremantle to Rockingham and Mandurah. It had ruled out a dedicated busway, but had not yet chosen between heavy rail and light rail. The SWAT Steering Committee was formed to assess various things for the line, namely the transit mode, route, cost, and the community's preference regarding the transit mode and route. The SWAT committee recommended the use of heavy rail like the rest of Perth's rail system. Premier Carmen Lawrence made the commitment ahead of the 1993 state election to build this line as far as Rockingham by 1996, and to Mandurah by 2001.

Separately from any other planning, Westrail was asked by the Department of Planning and Urban Development in 1992 or 1993 to investigate doing a direct route from Perth to Mandurah instead of via Fremantle. The direct route was to pass through the emerging regional centre of Thomsons Lake, now known as Cockburn Central, and make the journey to the Perth central business district (CBD) quicker. The median of the Kwinana Freeway south of the Narrows Bridge was seen as being too narrow for a railway, so that route was not considered. Westrail came up with a plan for the line to run underground from the Perth CBD to the Mount Henry Bridge. At $800 million, this was considered too expensive.

After Richard Court won the election for the Liberal Party, the government put aside any immediate plans for the line, saying that it was far too expensive and too soon after the Joondalup line was built. The Court government started a new study to determine if a busway would be an acceptable alternative to light rail or heavy rail, options which had already been costed at $326 million to $570 million. In August 1995, the government announced new plans for the railway to Mandurah. It was going to take a new route, branching off from the Armadale line at Kenwick, running parallel to the Kwinana freight railway to Jandakot, where it would then run south to Rockingham and Mandurah. The railway was to undergo a staged construction, with the first stage from Kenwick to Jandakot opening within 10 years at a cost of $150 million. The cost of the entire line was to be $570 million. The land for this was reserved in the Metropolitan Region Scheme in December 1994, and land acquisition commenced after that. The land for the railway was also reserved in the forthcoming Peel Region Scheme, which was gazetted on 23 October 2002.

Armadale line spur
Cabinet approved the creation of a master plan in April 1997, with its preparation starting later that year. Amongst its objectives were to establish the line's feasibility, develop concepts, confirm the final route, develop patronage estimates, decide on the number and location of stations, determine how the line will operate and integrate with other transport services, determine rolling stock and infrastructure requirements, determine the environmental impact, determine the cost, examine options for funding, and prepare enabling legislation. The master plan, called the South West Metropolitan Railway (SWMP) Master Plan, was endorsed by cabinet in March 1999.

The route laid out by the master plan was as follows. The service would commence at Perth station, running alongside the Armadale line until Kenwick, where it would enter a tunnel and pass under the Armadale line, Albany Highway, Roe Highway and the Kwinana freight railway. It would emerge from the tunnel and run south west, parallel to the freight railway. Along this section, the stations planned were at Thornlie (now Thornlie station), Nicholson Road (now Nicholson Road station), and Ranford Road (then named Canning Vale station; now Ranford Road station). There was also provision for a station at Jandakot Airport near Karel Avenue for the future. After travelling along the freight railway, the line would enter a tunnel and emerge within the median strip of the Kwinana Freeway. Having the line run along the side of the freeway was considered, as the freeway median was initially viewed as being too narrow. This option would have resulted in greater station accessibility but take the line close to current and planned residential areas. The line would have run along the eastern side of the freeway before crossing to the western side north of Berrigan Drive. This option was not chosen, limiting the adverse environmental impact of the freeway and railway to a narrower strip. The stations along the freeway section of the line were to be at Berrigan Drive (named South Lake station) and Beeliar Drive (then named Thomsons Lake station; now Cockburn Central station), with provisions for future stations at Gibbs Road/Russell Road (then named Success station; now Aubin Grove station), Rowley Road (named Mandogalup station), and Anketell Road (named Anketell). At Thomas Road, the railway would exit the freeway via a tunnel and travel south west through Kwinana. In Kwinana, the stations planned were at Thomas Road (now Kwinana station) and at Leda (now Wellard station), with a future station at Challenger Avenue (named South Parmelia station).

Through Rockingham, there were several alignments considered. The Minister for Planning commissioned the Rockingham City Centre Railway Access Study in 1996 to provide some options. The study recommended a route which travelled through the Rockingham city centre, partially in a tunnel. Cabinet endorsed this route in August 1997 after being told the estimated cost was $119 million. This was the route that the City of Rockingham wanted as well, with the Rockingham Council saying it strongly opposed any route that bypassed the Rockingham city centre as it would be detrimental by siphoning workers out of Rockingham and into the Perth CBD. After cabinet endorsement, more detailed costing and evaluation of the endorsed route and alternative routes was done. The new cost of the favoured option was determined to be $269 million. As a result, more options were developed by a workshop, and these were refined to three options for the 1999 master plan. The first option had a cost of $143 million, and involved  of track in a trench or underground and two stations: one within the Rockingham city centre, and one north of Rockingham at Ennis Avenue. The second option had a cost of $107 million, and involved  of track in a trench or underground and two stations: one within the Rockingham city centre, and one north of Rockingham at Ennis Avenue. The third option bypassed the Rockingham city centre, had a cost of $31 million, involved no tunnels or trenches, and had one station at Dixon Road and provisions for a future station on Ennis Avenue south of Elanora Drive (named Cooloongup). This option also had a dedicated bus service to link the station to the city centre. In addition to the higher cost of the tunnel options, there would also have been higher transit time for those travelling though Rockingham without getting off the train there.

Running south from Rockingham along the eastern side of Ennis Avenue, the double tracked section of the line was planned to end at Safety Bay Road, at Waikiki station (now Warnbro station. South from there, the line was to run single tracked to Mandurah station, including crossing Stakehill Road, Paganoni Road, and a road in Lakelands at the line's only level crossings. Future station provisions were to be at Stakehill Road (named Stakehill station), Paganoni Road (named Karnup station), Lakelands, and Gordon Road.

Additionally, the master plan found that works were required along the Perth to Kenwick portion for the operation of the Mandurah line. These proposed works included an additional platform at Perth station, a rebuild of Victoria Park station, closure of Lathlain station, a rebuild of Carlisle station, closure of Welshpool station, a rebuild of Beckenham station, and the removal of most level crossings. The master plan stipulated that the Mandurah line run as a through service with the Joondalup line, a role which the Armadale line was fulfilling at the time. Among the advantages were that it would result in fewer trains needing to turn around at Perth station and the associated infrastructure requirements that arose from that. 104 railcars would have had to be purchased, which would be stored at a depot at Rockingham and at Nowergup on the Joondalup line.

In April 2000, an expanded version of the SWMR Master Plan was released by the government.

The Railway (Northern and Southern Urban Extensions) Act, which enabled the construction of the Mandurah line via Kenwick, passed the Western Australian Parliament in November 1999.

In December 2000, the government announced that the railway between Warnbro and Mandurah would be double tracked. Under the previous single track design, maximum train frequency south of Warnbro was restricted to two trains per hour. The additional cost was $20 million.

Direct route

However, following a change in State Government in 2001, a bill was passed that saw the route altered to start at Perth station, travel through a   tunnel, traverse the Kwinana Freeway, and then continue along its initial route after Jandakot. This second route was much more direct, and allowed through services with the Joondalup line; however it was more costly. The new route had a 20% faster journey time from Mandurah station to Perth, and a 40% faster journey time from Thomsons Lake to Perth. It also had higher projected patronage, with 24,950 passengers per day projected, as opposed to 19,100 for the route via Kenwick. The new route also meant that there is a higher maximum capacity for each line, as there are no tracks with multiple lines limiting maximum capacity. It also provided an opportunity for a new station at the south end of the Perth CBD, closer to the offices on St Georges Terrace. The route included the following stations:

William Street (Perth) station
Esplanade (Elizabeth Quay) station
Canning Bridge station
Leach Highway (Bull Creek) station
South Street (Murdoch) station
Thomsons Lake (Cockburn Central) station
Thomas Road (Kwinana) station
Leda (Wellard) station
Rockingham station
Waikiki (Warnbro) station
Mandurah station

South Lake station was along the new alignment but was relegated to being built in the future. Leda station was budgeted for but was planned on opening later than the other stations. Thornlie, Nicholson Road, and Canning Vale stations were removed from the plan as they were along the Kwinana freight railway alignment.

This decision also led to the relocation of the Rockingham station from the city centre to the outer edge to offset the additional costs of the Perth section. The original route included tunnels to bring the railway into the Rockingham CBD. As a trade-off for relocating Rockingham station to the outer edge, the State Government promised a light rail link to the Rockingham CBD. This was later revised to a Central Area Transit style bus service partly within a dedicated busway. As part of the work, the Narrows and Mount Henry Bridges were rebuilt.

Detailed planning and construction
The design and construction of the project was split up into eight packages. They are as follows:

All of these packages were managed by New MetroRail except for Package E, which was managed by Main Roads Western Australia. New MetroRail was a division of the Western Australian Government Railways Commission (later the Public Transport Authority), set up in March 2003 as a rebrand of the Perth Urban Rail Development Project. This division managed the construction of the Mandurah line, as well as an extension to the Joondalup line and upgrades along the Armadale line.

The first contracts were awarded in April 2002: the contract for designing Package B was awarded to Woodhead International Architects for $2.1 million, and the contract for designing Package C was awarded to Jones Coulter Young Pty Ltd for $2.5 million. Woodhead recruited MPS Architects to do part of the design work for Package B, and Jones Coulter Young recruited Taylor Robinson Architects to do part of the design work for Mandurah and Warnbro stations. The $9.7 million design contract for Package A was awarded to Maunsell SKM Joint Venture in September 2002, and the $3.1 million design contract for Package D was awarded to Woodhead International Architects and MPS Architects in October 2002. Woodhead designed Bull Creek and Canning Bridge stations, and MPS designed Murdoch station.

The Railway (Jandakot to Perth) Act passed parliament on 27 November 2002, and received royal assent on 5 December 2002, enabling the construction of the railway between Perth and Jandakot to begin.

Expressions of interest for the construction of Package F closed on 16 April 2003. The five proponents that applied were City Connect (joint venture between Clough, McConnell Dowell and Obayashi); Bilfinger Berger–Baulderstone Hornibrook; Leighton–Kumagai Gumi Team; Multiplex–John Holland–Tyco Group; and Henry Walker Eltin–Bouygues. City Connect and Leighton–Kumagai Gumi Team were shortlisted on 29 May 2003. The request for proposals began on 16 June 2003, and the detailed submissions from each consortia were due on 18 September 2003.

In July 2003, the Environmental Protection Authority submitted a Public Environmental Review to the Minister for Environment, Judy Edwards. She approved the environmental review on 14 November 2003.

Expressions of interest for the construction of the three station packages, packages B, C and D, opened in September 2003, and closed on 30 October.

In December 2003, Cabinet decided to award the construction contract for Package E to Leighton Contractors Pty Ltd, and the construction contract for Package F to Leighton-Kumagai Gumi Team. The completion date of the entire line to Mandurah was also brought forward to December 2006. Leighton Contractors had been selected as the preferred proponent for Package E, and Leighton-Kumagai Gumi Team had been selected as the preferred proponent for Package F in October 2003.

The contract for the design and construction of Package E was signed on 14 January 2004. This package consisted of all the roadworks along the Kwinana Freeway. This included the construction of a new bridge between the two existing Narrows Bridges, for the southbound tracks. The northbound tracks were built on the existing northbound road bridge, which had to be strengthened to withstand the weight of a train. The Mount Henry Bridge had to have a new bridge for northbound road traffic built next to the existing bridge. The existing bridge was strengthened, for railway tracks to go across it. Existing bridges along the Kwinana Freeway had to have various modifications, including pier strengthening and protection. The freeway had to undergo minor realignment in parts so that the railway could fit. The layout of onramps and offramps at Leach Highway and South Street had to be changed, as that was where Bull Creek and Murdoch stations were to be built respectively.

Package E also included the construction of the railway formation layer along the Kwinana Freeway, construction of drainage along that section, construction of concrete barriers between the freeway and the railway, and construction of noise walls along some stretches. Initially, this bridge was going to be demolished and rebuilt, but it was determined that moving the bridge was viable and more economical.

The contract for the design and construction of Package F was awarded to Leighton–Kumagai Gumi on 14 February 2004. The main part of this package was the tunnelling under the Perth central business district and the construction of Perth Underground and Esplanade stations. The two stations were also cut-and-cover. Smaller parts of Package F included changes to the traction power supply sections around Perth station, changes to the layout of the Perth rail yard, alterations and strengthening of the Horseshoe Bridge, construction of a pedestrian tunnel under Wellington Street to link Perth underground to the existing Perth station, and landscaping and changes to the road layout around the southern tunnel portal. Construction on Package F began in March 2004, making this package the first one to begin construction. The tunnel was the first railway tunnel to be built in Perth since 1895 when the Swan View Tunnel was built in the present-day John Forrest National Park. This was the most challenging portion of the Mandurah line project, with it being heavily criticised in the press.

The tunnel boring machine, manufactured by Mitsubishi Heavy Industries, was lifted into position in the Esplanade station box on 14 August 2005. Following a slight delay due to technical issues during commissioning, the TBM started boring the eastern tunnel on 25 October 2005. The first tunnel was complete when the TBM broke though to the northern tunnel portal on 4 June 2006. The machine was transported back to Esplanade station to do the second tunnel. It broke through to William Street station on 31 August 2006, and broke through the northern tunnel portal on 24 October 2006. With the TBM designed specifically for Perth's sandy soils, it had to be scrapped following the project as no buyers could be found.

On 23 May 2004, the contract for the construction of Package A was awarded to RailLink Joint Venture: a joint venture between John Holland, Macmahon Contractors, and Multiplex Constructions, after being named the preferred tenderer in late 2003. As only parts of this package were fully designed by MSKM and New MetroRail during the design contract, the construction contract also included a design component. This package included bulk earthworks for stations between Mandurah and Cockburn Central; civil works, drainage, and track structure between Mandurah and the Narrows Bridge; the traction power network from Mandurah to north of the Narrows Bridge, including overhead wires, feeder stations at Jandakot and Karnup, and track sectioning cabins; roadworks between Mandurah and Glen Iris, including rail, road, and pedestrian bridges; signals and communication for the entire line; Mandurah railcar depot; and connecting the signalling, power and communications systems to the rest of the network at Perth Yard.

In May 2004, construction began on Package E, with works commencing on the Mount Henry Bridge. The new bridge opened to traffic on 22 January 2006.

In November 2004, the contract for Package D was awarded to John Holland. In March 2005, the contract for Package B was awarded to Doric Brierty Joint Venture, a joint venture between Doric Constructions and Brierty Contractors. The Doric Brierty Joint Venture was again awarded a contract in June 2005, for Package C[a], which was for Rockingham and Warnbro stations; the contract for Package C[b], which was for the construction of Mandurah station, was awarded to J.M. & E.D. Moore. The construction of the stations from Canning Bridge to Mandurah started from mid- to late-2005.

In April 2005, Planning and Infrastructure Minister Alannah MacTiernan announced that the line's scheduled opening date had been delayed to April 2007. The contingency sum was increased by $45.193 as well, due to two station contracts being above estimates from 2002 and new safety standards for earthing and insulation. In April 2006, MacTiernan announced that the line's opening date had been delayed to July 2007, with Package E being behind schedule. The contingency sum was increased by $49.801 million, bringing the project's total cost to $1.613 billion.

Track laying commenced, starting from a track laying depot in Hillman, on 16 March 2006. Track laying between Mandurah and the Narrows Bridge was completed in December 2006.

In June 2006, the government reached a $21.8 million settlement with the RailLink Joint Venture, as RailLink's construction was delayed through no fault of their own.

In January 2007, Mandurah, Kwinana, Wellard, and Cockburn Central stations were complete. Rockingham and Warnbro stations were completed on 9 March 2007. Canning Bridge, Bull Creek, and Murdoch stations reached practical completion in June 2007.

In April 2007, Planning and Infrastructure Minister Alannah MacTiernan revealed the line was delayed, with opening likely in October 2007.

The first test train ran on the line, between Perth Yard and Esplanade station, in August 2007. In September 2007, the overhead wiring system was energised between Perth Yard and south of Esplanade station. This section reached practical completion in September 2007, with the site being handed over to the Public Transport Authority on 10 September 2007.

From 7 to 14 October 2007, a planned shutdown of the whole Fremantle line and partial closure of the Joondalup line between Perth and Leederville stations was undertaken to allow workers to connect the Mandurah line to the Joondalup line. On 15 October 2007, Perth Underground and Esplanade stations opened. On this day, the railway also carried its first passengers with the extension of Joondalup line services to Esplanade station.

On 9 November 2007, the first train crossed the Narrows Bridge to Rockingham station, testing the new railway line at around 07:30 with a driver and a group of engineers. After the line testing completed, driver training was undertaken.

The line was officially opened on 23 December 2007, with the first train carrying 1,500 passengers, including 1,000 members of the public selected by ballot.

The line replaced bus services that previously travelled along the freeway to the city, which now terminate at Mandurah line stations. The exception is Canning Highway services, which stop at Canning Bridge station before continuing to the city.

Post-opening
Since opening, there have been proposals for stations to be built at South Perth, Aubin Grove, Karnup and Lakelands. Of those stations, Aubin Grove was opened in 2017, and Lakelands station started construction in 2021.

After the opening of the Mandurah line, the government committed to building a station by 2010 at Richardson Street in South Perth. The station would serve major attractions such as Perth Zoo and crowds heading to the South Perth foreshore to watch the City of Perth Skyworks. After a change in government in September 2008, South Perth station was delayed to opening in 2013. The station was not in the 2009 state budget, and has not been built since.

In August 2012, the government announced plans for the construction of Aubin Grove station, at Russell Road between Cockburn Central station and Kwinana station. The station was planned to cost $80 million. A tender for the construction of the station was released in July 2014. In February 2015, CAMPS, which is a joint venture between Coniglio Ainsworth Architects and M. P. S. Architects, was selected to design the station. In late-2015, Georgiou Group was awarded the construction contract. Construction began in March 2016, and on 23 April 2017, the station was opened. The project had a final cost of $125 million, of which $72 million was for the station.

Ahead of the 2017 state election, both major parties promised to build a $520 million extension of the Thornlie line to link up with the Mandurah line at Cockburn. The line was planned to follow the previously planned alignment of the Mandurah line, along the Kwinana freight railway, and have stations at Ranford Road and Nicholson Road, before entering the Kwinana Freeway and terminating at a new platform at Cockburn Central station. One of the publicised advantages of the line was that it would make getting to Perth Stadium quicker for people south of Cockburn Central, as the stadium, which was under construction at the time, is along the Armadale/Thornlie line. The Labor Party also promised to built a station at Karnup, between Mandurah and Warnbro, as part of their proposed Metronet program of public transport expansion.

The Labor Party won the election. Early works began in late 2019, with full constructing beginning in 2020. As part of a major realignment of railway tracks at the Cockburn Central railway station, the Mandurah line was closed between Elizabeth Quay and Aubin Grove from 26 December 2021 to 14 January 2022, in what Metronet said was the longest ever shutdown on Perth's public transport network. In this time, the existing tracks were moved to the edge of the rail corridor to make room for the new Thornlie line tracks that will run between the Mandurah line tracks.

The Labor Party also promised ahead of the 2017 election to build a station at Karnup, between Mandurah and Warnbro. In March 2019, Prime Minister Scott Morrison promised $10 million in federal funding for a station at Lakelands, between Mandurah and Karnup. That was later increased to 80% of the $80 million construction cost, which prompted the state government in November 2019 to delay construction of Karnup station in favour of constructing Lakelands station. Requests from the state government for the federal government to fund Karnup station instead were refused. ADCO Constructions was selected as the preferred proponent in December 2021, with the company being awarded the contract in January 2020. Works for Lakelands station began in August 2021.

Description
During hot weather, the tracks can distort. As a result, train speeds are reduced by approximately  when the air temperature is above , and by an additional  when the air temperature is above .

The line uses an overhead 25 kV AC power supply system, which is the same system as the rest of the Transperth network. Third rail 750 V DC power was considered but was not chosen because it would require the rolling stock to be modified to use both power systems, which would reduce performance and cost over $20million. This system would also require that traction supply substations be located within  intervals.

The Transperth network currently uses fixed block signalling and automatic train protection, which stops trains that pass a red signal and slows trains that drive too fast. These systems will be replaced by an automatic train control system, likely a communications-based train control system. The new systems are planned to be in place on the Mandurah line by June 2029, and will allow up to at least 30 trains per hour to use the line.

Fencing is used along the entire line aside from the freeway and tunnel sections. Concrete barriers are along the freeway section of the line, separating road traffic from the railway.

Route

The Mandurah line operates as a through service with the Joondalup line. The service between Perth Underground station and Elizabeth Quay station is designated as both the Mandurah and Joondalup lines. This section is underground in twin bored tunnels, and has a roughly north-south heading. Perth Underground station has an underground pedestrian link to the rest of Perth station. North of Perth Underground station, along the Joondalup line, the track bends westwards, then surfaces parallel to the Fremantle line, allowing trains to switch tracks to the rest of the network.

South from Elizabeth Quay station, the tracks bend westwards in a cut-and-cover tunnel, surfacing in parts for the next , before permanently surfacing.  after that, the railway passes under a bridge for the southbound carriageway of the Mitchell Freeway, whilst gradually turning south, and entering the freeway's median. Just south of there, the railway crosses the Swan River on the Narrows Bridge, where the Mitchell Freeway changes name to the Kwinana Freeway.

From the Narrows Bridge, the railway travels along the median of the Kwinana Freeway, parallel to the shore of the Swan and Canning rivers. The only station along this section is Canning Bridge station, which is at the point where the Canning Highway crosses the freeway and the Canning River.

Past the Mount Henry Bridge, the railway continues south in the median of the Kwinana Freeway. Stations along this section, from north to south, are Bull Creek station, where Leach Highway interchanges with the freeway; Murdoch station, where South Street interchanges with the freeway; Cockburn Central station, between the freeway's interchanges with Armadale Road and Beeliar Drive; and Aubin Grove station, where the freeway has an interchange with Russell Road and Gibbs Road. About halfway between Murdoch station and Cockburn Central station is the Glen Iris Tunnel, where the Thornlie line will enter the Kwinana Freeway median.  south of the Mount Henry Bridge, the railway dives down into a cut-and-cover tunnel, and exits the Kwinana Freeway.

After exiting the freeway, the railway goes in a south-westerly direction, passing through the City of Kwinana. Stations along here are Kwinana station and Wellard station. For the remainder of the line, it travels south, through rural and suburban areas, towards Mandurah station. For  in Mandurah, the railway travels in the median of Mandjoogoordap Drive, entering and exiting the road through cut-and-cover tunnels. At the line's Mandurah terminus, there is a small railcar depot, used for cleaning and storing trains overnight.

Stations

The Mandurah line has 12 stations. All 10 stations outside the Perth CBD have been designed with a dedicated bus interchange.

Service
The Mandurah line has two stopping patterns in addition to all stops services. The W stopping pattern stops at all stations between Perth and Cockburn Central. The K stopping pattern stops at all stations between Perth and Rockingham. During peak hour, all stops services run at six trains per hour and W pattern services run at six trains per hour, resulting in a combined frequency of twelve trains per hour between Cockburn Central and Perth. During the day outside peak hour and on weekends, all stops services run at four trains per hour, and W pattern services do not run. There is only one K pattern service per day, in the early morning at the start of peak.

Originally when the Mandurah line opened, the W stopping pattern ran all day, with a between-peak frequency of four trains per hour. This resulted in a combined frequency of twelve trains per hour between Cockburn Central and Perth. This stopped on 28 June 2009, leaving just the peak hour services. with the government citing poor utilisation of those services outside peak hour as the reason. There also used to be a C stopping pattern, which stopped at all stations except Canning Bridge. It operated during peak at frequency of six trains per hour. This pattern was replaced by the current all stops service on 31 January 2016.

By 2031, it is planned for the K pattern to run at 6 trains per hour during peak, for a total frequency of 18 trains per hour between Perth and Cockburn Central. This frequency is predicted to increase to 24 trains per hour by 2046.

Rolling stock

The Mandurah line is operated exclusively by Transperth B-series trains, which are three cars long each and are typically coupled together to form six-car sets. Previously, there were Transperth A-series trains operating on the line. A-series trains typically operated along the Perth to Cockburn Central section. As more B-series trains were delivered, A-series trains were moved from the Joondalup and Mandurah lines to the other lines on the network. Starting in late-2023, Transperth C-series trains will be operating on the Mandurah line. The higher number of doors will help reduce dwell times at stations, making 18 trains per hour possible. B-series trains will be gradually transferred onto the other lines to replace A-series trains. By about 2031, all trains on the Mandurah line will be C-series trains.

In May 2002, the government signed a contract with EDI Rail–Bombardier Transportation for the delivery and maintenance of 31 three car B-series trains, and the construction of the Nowergup depot. These trains were all delivered before the opening of the Mandurah line. In December 2006, the government signed another contract for 15 more three car B-series trains. The first of these additional railcars were delivered in 2009, allowing several A-series trains to be moved from the Joondalup and Mandurah lines to other lines on the network, and for frequencies to increase on most lines, including the Mandurah line. In July 2011, the government ordered 15 more three car B-series trains. In August 2012, this order was increased by two, to cater for the opening of Aubin Grove station. In November 2012, this order was increased by five, bringing the total order to 22 three car trains. By the final delivery from that order, all trains operating on the Mandurah and Joondalup lines were B-series trains. In December 2019, the government signed a contract with Alstom for the construction of 41 six car C-series trains. These trains are expected to be delivered starting in 2022.

Most trains on the Mandurah line are stored and cleaned at Nowergup depot. There is also Mandurah depot, which can store and clean a smaller number of trains. Maintenance occurs at Nowergup depot. As a result of increasing train frequency, a new depot may be required in the future along the Mandurah line.

Patronage
Prior to the Mandurah line opening, the Kwinana Freeway bus system carried 16,000 passengers per day. Within the first few weeks of operation, the Mandurah line reached the predicted patronage of 50,000 passengers per day. Some stations had a significantly higher patronage than what was expected leading to car parks being full and peak hour services almost at capacity. In the PTA's 2007-08 annual report, CEO Reece Waldock described the line as "a victim of its own success". The Mandurah line opening had an impact on patronage for the entire Transperth system as well: in the 2007-08 financial year, ending in June 2008, there was 108.8 million Transperth boardings, 7.8% higher than in 2006-07. In the 2008-09 financial year, the first full financial year of Mandurah line operation, there was 128.8 million. In the first six months of 2008, 28% of fare-paying train boardings were on the Mandurah line, making it the busiest line. Waldock attributed the higher than expected patronage to three reasons: the resources boom in Western Australia at time, which caused high interstate migration to Western Australia; increases in the price of fuel; and concerns relating to climate change.

In the 2018-19 financial year, the year before the COVID-19 pandemic, the line had 20.9 million boardings. In the 2021-22 financial year, the line had 14.4 million boardings.

References

Bibliography

External links

 
Mandurah
Railway lines in Perth, Western Australia
Railway lines opened in 2007
2007 establishments in Australia
3 ft 6 in gauge railways in Australia
Railway lines in highway medians